Princess Maria Anna of Anhalt-Dessau (14 September 1837, Dessau –  12 May 1906, Friedrichroda) was a princess from the House of Ascania. She was the third child of Leopold IV, Duke of Anhalt and Princess Frederica of Prussia.

Family
Maria Anna's paternal grandparents were Frederick, Hereditary Prince of Anhalt-Dessau and Landgravine Amalie of Hesse-Homburg. Her maternal grandparents were Prince Louis Charles of Prussia (brother of King Frederick William III of Prussia) and Frederica of Mecklenburg-Strelitz.

Maria Anna was a younger sister of Frederick I, Duke of Anhalt and Agnes, Duchess of Saxe-Altenburg.

Marriage and issue
On 29 November 1854, she married her second cousin Prince Frederick Charles of Prussia. He was a grandson of Frederick William III of Prussia by his father Prince Charles of Prussia. They had five children:

Their marriage was unhappy. After the birth of their fourth daughter, Prince Frederick Charles reportedly beat his wife for not producing a son. According to one source, it was only by the entreaties of Emperor Wilhelm I that a separation never occurred.

Maria Anna was considered by contemporaries to be one of the loveliest women of her generation. She possessed a remarkable talent for music and painting, and often advised young girls when they first entered society. Maria Anna was almost completely deaf, which according to her friend Princess Catherine Radziwill, "caused her to show extreme timidity and embarrassment whenever she found herself in company". Radziwill went on to say however that "when [Maria Anna] was alone with you, and not disturbed by the noise of many conversations around her, she became quite charming, and really witty".

Later life
Her husband Prince Frederick Charles died on 15 June 1885. After his death, Maria Anna left Berlin for Italy, staying mainly in Naples, Rome, and Florence. Rumors soon emerged that Maria Anna contracted a morganatic marriage to Capt. von Wagenheim, one of her equerries.

In 1889, their only son Prince Frederick married Princess Louise Sophie of Schleswig-Holstein-Sonderburg-Augustenburg, a sister of Empress Augusta Viktoria. Maria Anna died on 12 May 1906 in
Friedrichroda.

Ancestry

References

Sources

House of Ascania
House of Hohenzollern
Princesses of Anhalt-Dessau
Prussian princesses
1837 births
1906 deaths
People from Dessau-Roßlau
Daughters of monarchs